"We Interrupt This Program" is the fourth episode of the 2021 American television miniseries WandaVision.

We Interrupt This Program (or Programme) may also refer to:

Television
 "We Interrupt This Program", an episode of the 1998 miniseries From the Earth to the Moon
 "We Interrupt This Program", a 1997 episode of the 1990 American TV series Beverly Hills, 90210
 "We Interrupt This Program", a 2017 episode of the 2014 American TV series Z Nation

Music
 "We Interrupt This Programme" (song), a 2005 song by British electronic band Coburn
 "We Interrupt This Program - News Medley", a track from the 1985 compilation album Television's Greatest Hits: 65 TV Themes! From the 50's and 60's

Other uses
 We Interrupt This Program... (play), a 1975 play by Norman Krasna

See also
 We Interrupt This Broadcast, 1998 non-fiction book by Joe Garner
 We Interrupt This Broadcast (TV series), a 2023 Australian comedy series 
 Interrupt This Program, a 2015 Canadian documentary series
 Breaking news, often accompanied by this phrase
 Emergency Broadcast System, an emergency warning system which began with this phrase